is a Japanese manga series written and illustrated by Kyuryu Z. Originally published on the author's Twitter account in December 2019, the series was later acquired by Kadokawa Shoten, who began publishing the series in tankōbon volumes in October 2020. As of October 2022, four volumes have been released. An anime television series adaptation by Studio Puyukai aired from August to September 2022, and continued as an original net animation (ONA) from October 2022 to January 2023. A second season premiered in March 2023.

Characters

Media

Manga
The series began publication on Kyuryu Z's Twitter account in December 2019. It was later acquired by Kadokawa Shoten, who began publishing the series in tankōbon form on October 29, 2020. As of October 2022, four tankōbon volumes have been released.

At Anime NYC 2021, Yen Press announced that they licensed the series for English publication.

Volume list

Anime
An anime adaptation was announced on April 26, 2022. It was later revealed to be a television series produced by Studio Puyukai and directed and written by Minoru Ashina, with Minoru Takehara designing the characters, and Kana Utatane composing the music. The series aired from August 4 to September 22, 2022 on Tokyo MX and AT-X. It then continued online as an original net animation (ONA) on YouTube from October 12, 2022 to January 11, 2023. The theme song "Hinata no Kuni" was performed by Kashitarō Itō.

A second season was announced on January 11, 2023. The cast and staff reprised their roles. It premiered on March 8, 2023. The theme song, "Neko Neko Biyori", is again performed by Kashitarō Itō.

Notes

References

External links
  
 

2022 anime ONAs
Anime series based on manga
Comedy anime and manga
Comics about cats
Japanese webcomics
Kadokawa Dwango franchises
Kadokawa Shoten manga
Studio Puyukai
Tokyo MX original programming
Webcomics in print
Yen Press titles